Chicago Children's Choir is a non-profit organization, founded in 1956 at First Unitarian Church of Chicago.

Organization
Founded in Hyde Park in 1956, CCC has grown from one choir into a network of in-school and after-school programs serving nearly 5,000 students across the city of Chicago. Noteworthy faculty include Josephine Lee who currently serves as president and artistic director, Judy Hanson, senior associate artistic director, W Mitchell Owens, composer-in-residence, Lonnie Norwood, Director of Africana studies, and John Goodwin, principal pianist and resident conductor.

History
In 1956 during the Civil Rights Movement, the late Rev. Christopher Moore founded the multiracial, multicultural Chicago Children's Choir at Hyde Park's First Unitarian Church of Chicago. He believed that youth from diverse backgrounds could better understand each other - and themselves - by learning to make beautiful music together. Today, the choir is fully independent and serves all of Chicago from its home in the Chicago Cultural Center. 

Distinguished singers included David Edmonds, who performed with the choir from 1970 to 1977. He sang classical, folk and spiritual pieces as lead soloist in numerous concerts, both in Chicago and on national tours. He can be heard on the choir's 1972 album Chicago Children's Choir Sings at Orchestra Hall. Edmonds also performed with the Joffrey Ballet, the Rockefeller Chapel Orchestra and Chorus, and the Bretton Woods Boy Singers. He died from AIDS complications in 1990.

Discography

Albums

 Studs Terkel interview with Christopher Moore and CCC music (1959)
 This is Rhythm (1960) (with Ella Jenkins) 
 Flower Communion (1961)
 Recording at First Unitarian Church (1962-1963)
 "You'll Sing a Song and I'll Sing a Song" recording with Ella Jenkins (1966)
 "Play Your Instruments and Make a Pretty Sound" recording with Ella Jenkins (1967)
 Chicago Children's Choir Sings at Orchestra Hall (1972)
 Behold This Star (1973)
 Jambo and Other Call and Response Songs and Chants (with Ella Jenkins) (1974)
 Chicago Children's Choir In Concert (1974)
 Let George Do It (1974)
 Chicago Children's Choir Sings for Children (1976)
 It's Music (1977)
 Lift Every Voice (1981)
 Hopping around from place to place with Ella Jenkins (1983)
 April Tour Team (1985)
 June Galas Concert (1985)
 Gospel Mass (1986)
 In the Folk Tradition (1987)
 Selections from the CCC (1990)
 Songs of the Season (1991)
 June Galas (1992)
 Japan Tour Excerpts (1992)
 Children's Choral Festival (1993)
 The Thrilling Sound of the CCC (1993)
 Hop, Hop, Hop! Sing-and-Dance Songs from Ladybug (1994) (with Oriana Singers)
 Simple Gifts (1994)
 Do You Hear the People Sing (1996) (Recorded live from South Africa tour)
 40 Years of Harmony (1997)
 Songs of the Human Spirit (c.2000)
 Spring Gala Concert (2001)
 Chicago Children's Choir Live from Vienna (2001)
 Open Up Your Heart (2004)
 You Shall Have a Song (2004)
 Sita Ram (2008)
 Songs on the Road to Freedom (2008)
 The Very Best Time of the Year: Music for the Holiday Season (c.2009)
 Holiday Harmony (2009)
 Holiday (2010)
 We All Live Here (2016)
 Harmony Anew (2019)

Other appearances
 The Life and Times - Tragic Boogie (2009, Arena Rock)
 Chance the Rapper - "All We Got", "Same Drugs", "How Great", and "Finish Line / Drown" from Coloring Book (2016)

Tours

Voice of Chicago (formerly Concert Choir) tours:
2023
Lexington, KY - Jan. 14-17, 2023 
Miami, FL (w/ Dimension) - Mar. 1-5, 2023
2022 - Egypt - Jun. 19-30, 2022 
2020 - Los Angeles, CA - CANCELLED due to the Covid-19 pandemic - was planned for Apr. 30 - May 4, 2020
2019 - Spain - Jun. 20 - Jul. 1, 2019
2018 - Israel & Palestine - CANCELLED due to political unrest
2017 - Italy - Jul. 4-13, 2017
2016 - Havana, Cuba (last tour organized by beloved tour coordinator Beth Kershner)
2015 - New York City & Washington, DC
2014 - South Africa

Concert Choir tours:
2013 - India
2012 - Italy 
2011 - Baltic Tour: Estonia, Finland & Latvia w/ Bobby McFerrin
2010 - Alaska
2009 - South American Tour: Argentina and Uruguay
2008 - South Korea
2007 - "Freedom Tour": Alabama, Tennessee, Mississippi & Louisiana
2006 - Czech Republic
2005 - Japan
2004 - Canada
2003 - Germany
2002 - Japan
2001 - Germany, Austria & Hungary
2000 - Colorado
1999 - England, Scotland & Wales
1998 - Pacific Northwest & British Columbia
1997 - Italy, Sicily & Sardinia
1997 - Ukraine
1996 - South Africa
1995 - Canada
1994 - Russia
1993 - Mexico
1992 - Japan
1991 - New Orleans, Atlanta, Alabama

1956-1981: After Chicago Children's Choir began tours (overnight concert trips) in the mid-1960s, touring continued annually through at least 1981. Trips below that lasted less than a week are marked *. Those below lasting more than 11 days, always in summer, were Montreal I (1967: 3 wks), Boston (1969: 2 wks), and Europe (1970: 6 wks). Tours listed here all involved members of the Choir's top performance unit, designated "Senior Tour Unit" during most of this period.

1974-81: list incomplete
1981:  East Coast/Ontario (Toronto)
1978 - East Coast (April)
1978 - ? (March)
1977 - Ohio* (November)
1977 - East Coast/Canada (Toronto, Ottawa and Montreal) (April) and simultaneous trip in northern Illinois*
1977 - Southwest (March)
1976 - Madison*

1973 - East Coast (late April)
1973 - Tennessee (early April)
1973 - New England (March: "the blizzard tour")
1972 - New England (April)
1972 - Texas (March)
1971 - two simultaneous April tours to different parts of the East Coast
1970 - England, Denmark, West Germany (June–July)
1970 - New York III (April)
1970 - Colorado? (March)
1969 - Minnesota* (November) and another* simultaneously
1969 - Boston area
1969 - Washington, D.C. area (April)
1969 - New York II (March)
1968 - Kentucky-Tennessee* (autumn)
1968 - Iowa* (May)
1968 - New York I (April)
1968 - Madison WI* (March)
1967 - Montreal II (October: to Expo '67)
1967 - Montreal I (summer: to Expo '67)
1966 - Indianapolis* (November)
1965?- Madison*
1964?- Southwest (Tulsa OK)

References

Choirs in Illinois
Musical groups from Chicago
Organizations based in Chicago
1956 establishments in Illinois
Musical groups established in 1956
Choirs of children
Cedille Records artists